Janet Tibbits (born 11 October 1967) is an Australian swimmer. She competed in three events at the 1984 Summer Olympics.

References

External links
 

1967 births
Living people
Australian female swimmers
Olympic swimmers of Australia
Swimmers at the 1984 Summer Olympics
Place of birth missing (living people)
Commonwealth Games medallists in swimming
Commonwealth Games silver medallists for Australia
Swimmers at the 1982 Commonwealth Games
20th-century Australian women
Medallists at the 1982 Commonwealth Games